is a railway station located in the town of Itayanagi, Aomori Prefecture, Japan, operated by the East Japan Railway Company (JR East).

Lines
Itayanagi Station is served by the Gonō Line.

Station layout
Itayanagi Station has a single ground-level island platform, connected to the station building by a footbridge. The station has a Midori no Madoguchi staffed ticket office.

Platforms

History
Itayanagi Station was opened on September 25, 1918 as a station on the Mutsu Railway. It became a station on the Japanese Government Railways (JGR) when the Mutsu Railway was nationalized on June 1, 1927. With the privatization of the Japanese National Railways (successor to  JGR) on April 1, 1987, it came under the operational control of JR East.

Passenger statistics
In fiscal 2016, the station was used by an average of 351 passengers daily (boarding passengers only).

Surroundin area

Itayanagi town hall
Itayanagi Post Office
Itayanagi onsen

See also
 List of Railway Stations in Japan

References

External links

  

Stations of East Japan Railway Company
Railway stations in Aomori Prefecture
Gonō Line
Itayanagi, Aomori
Railway stations in Japan opened in 1918